Raha Assembly constituency is one of the 126 assembly constituencies of Assam Legislative Assembly. Raha forms part of the Nowgong Lok Sabha constituency. It is reserved for Scheduled Caste candidates.

Members of Legislative Assembly 

 1962 : Mahedra Nath Hazarika, Indian National Congress
 1967 : S.C Goswami, Indian National Congress
 1972 : Gunendra Nath Pandit, Indian National Congress
 1978 : Baliram Das, Janata party
 1983 : Lakhi Prasad Hazarika, Indian National Congress
 1985 : Umesh Chandra Das, Independent (politician)
 1991 : Gahin Chandra Das, Asom Gana Parisad  
 1996 : Gahin Chandra Das, Asom Gana Parisad
 2001 : Dr. Ananda Ram Baruah, Indian National Congress
 2006 : Guneswar Das, Assam United Democratic Front
 2011 : Pijush Hazarika, Indian National Congress
 2016 : Dimbeswar Das, Bhartiya Janata Party
 2021 : Sashi Kanta Das, Indian National Congress

Election results

2016 result

References

External links 
 

Assembly constituencies of Assam
Nagaon district